Burton-in-Kendal services is a motorway service station on the M6 motorway on the Cumbria, Lancashire border, England. It is located about 4 miles (6 km) north of Carnforth, and approximately 0.5 miles west of the Village of Burton in Kendal of which it takes its name. It is accessible to northbound traffic only, with southbound traffic having to use Killington Lake services (southbound only) about ten miles north (or the facilities in the town of Carnforth just off the motorway). It opened on 23 October 1970, operated by Mobil Motorway Services. It is currently operated by Moto.

Location
The services are located between junctions 35 and 36 on the M6, and is only available to northbound traffic.

External links 
Motorway Services Online – Burton-in-Kendal
Motorway Services Info – Burton-in-Kendal

External links

1970 establishments in England
M6 motorway service stations
Moto motorway service stations
Buildings and structures in Cumbria
Transport in Cumbria
Westmorland
Burton-in-Kendal